José Alexis Doldán Aquino (born 27 February 1997) is a Paraguayan footballer who plays as a centre-back for Atlético Tucumán on loan from Liga MX club Querétaro.

References

External links

José Doldán at Ascenso MX Official Profile

1997 births
Living people
Paraguayan footballers
Paraguayan expatriate footballers
Association football defenders
Liga MX players
Ascenso MX players
Alebrijes de Oaxaca players
Club Necaxa footballers
Querétaro F.C. footballers
Atlético Tucumán footballers
Paraguayan expatriate sportspeople in Mexico
Paraguayan expatriate sportspeople in Argentina
Expatriate footballers in Mexico
Expatriate footballers in Argentina